Martial Robin (born 27 August 1977 in Marseille) is a French former professional footballer who played as a midfielder or left-back.

He won Ligue 2 with Ajaccio and was a UEFA Cup runner-up with Marseille.

External links

1977 births
Living people
Footballers from Marseille
Association football midfielders
Association football fullbacks
French footballers
Olympique de Marseille players
AC Ajaccio players
Grenoble Foot 38 players
FC Istres players
Ligue 1 players
Ligue 2 players